Well integrity, in regard to oil wells, is defined by  as the "“Application of technical, operational and organizational solutions to reduce risk of uncontrolled release of formation fluids throughout the life cycle of a well”.  There are various facets to well integrity, including accountability/responsibility, well operating processes, well service processes, tubing/annulus integrity, tree/wellhead integrity and testing of safety systems.

A similar form of words are used in ISO 16530 well integrity standard

Accountability/responsibility
Accountability is the position that ensures a particular task is being done. They typically control the budget and organizational chart structure.

Responsibility is the position that actually does the task. There are a variety of tasks associated with well integrity and responsibility can reside with a field's well operations engineer, operators, well service technicians, etc.

Well operating processes
This includes processes such as personnel competency, well startup-operating-shutdown procedures, process to report anomalies, corrosion/erosion control, etc.

Well service processes
This includes processes such as personnel competency, intervention procedures, etc.

Tubing/annulus integrity
This refers to the integrity of the production tubing.  Common threats to tubing integrity are erosion and corrosion by production fluids, which denude the steel.  The other threat is pressure differential between the tubing and the 'A' annulus.  If it exceeds the rated pressure of the tubing, there is a risk of tubing burst or tubing collapse.

This refers to the integrity of the casing strings, which bound the annuli.  All annuli will naturally be filled to some level with brine or other fluids from the completion, though the 'A' annulus may have gas down to the lowest gas lift valve if the well is gas lifted.  The major integrity issues comes from the differential pressure across the casings due to the weight of brine on either side.  To protect well integrity, each annulus will have a Maximum Allowable Annulus Surface Pressure.

Tree and wellhead integrity
This refers to the integrity of the surface (or subsea) equipment.  The wellhead and the tree are typically suitably engineered to be able to withstand the normal operating pressures.  The major integrity issues for these components surround the operation of the valves, which are prone to leaking.  For this reason, valves must be routinely maintained.

Testing of safety systems
This refers to testing of surface and subsurface safety systems.

References

Oil wells